The 2009 flu pandemic in Oceania, part of an epidemic in 2009 of a new strain of influenza A virus subtype H1N1 causing what has been commonly called swine flu, has (as of 27 June 2009) afflicted at over 22,000 people in Oceania, with 56 confirmed deaths.  Almost all of the cases in Oceania have been in Australia, where the majority of cases have resulted from internal community spread of the virus.  In addition, the government of New Zealand, where most of the remainder of cases in Oceania have occurred, is on high alert for any people travelling into the country with flu-like symptoms.

Australia

As of July 9, 7,290 cases confirmed in Australia with 20 confirmed deaths. The alert level has been lifted from "delay" to "contain", giving authorities in all states the option to close schools if students are at risk.

Australia has a stockpile of 8.7 million doses of Tamiflu and Relenza. Airlines have been required to report passengers from the Americas with influenza symptoms, and nurses have been deployed at international airports.

On May 9, the first confirmed case in Australia was reported.

On May 20, four additional cases were reported, one in New South Wales and three in Victoria.

On May 21, an additional case was reported in Victoria.  Victorian health authorities close Clifton Hill Primary School for two days (initially) after three brothers return to the school from a trip to Disneyland and are confirmed to have H1N1.

On May 22, cases were reported in South Australia and Victoria, including the first reported cases where the virus was contracted in Australia.

On May 25, the first confirmed case in Western Australia was reported.

On May 26, 3 additional cases were reported in Sydney.  The newly confirmed cases involved two children who arrived in Sydney on the cruise ship named Pacific Dawn and another child who had recently returned from a trip to the United States.  NSW Health issued a directive to the 2000 passengers who arrived in Sydney on the Pacific Dawn requiring that they stay at home for 7 days.

On 19 June the first confirmed death from swine flu in Australia was a 26-year-old Aboriginal man from Kiwirrkurra Community in the Western Desert of Western Australia who died in Royal Adelaide Hospital.

Fiji
Fiji on Wednesday moved to high alert against the swine flu virus, with the authorities admitting the Pacific island nation was not immune to the rapidly spreading global threat.

On Thursday April 30, 2009, a traveller suspected of being infected by the swine flu virus is under close surveillance at Lautoka Hospital, said the Health Ministry. Hours later, the Health Ministry said there were two suspected cases. 2 cases of H1N1 confirmed in Fiji.

As of June 30, 2009 there are 10 confirmed cases of swine Flu in Fiji. 

On 10 July 2009, a total of 52 cases of swine flu were confirmed in the nation.

French Polynesia
French Polynesia has reported no cases of swine flu so far. Officials installed a thermal imaging camera on April 27, 2009, at Faa'a International Airport in Tahiti to screen all arriving international passengers. French Polynesia has 48,000 Tamiflu anti-viral treatments available in case of an outbreak, and more can be flown into Tahiti within twenty-four hours.
On June 10, 2009, French Polynesia reported its first confirmed case in the islands.

Indonesia

Marshall Islands
As of July 20, there were 4 confirmed cases in the Marshall Islands.

New Caledonia
On June 2, 2009 the authorities in New Caledonia refused to allow the cruise-ship from Australia, the Dawn Princess to dock because five patients on board had flu-like symptoms.

New Zealand

The impact in New Zealand has been unprecedented, with school closures across the country. There have been only isolated instances of community transmission.

On Saturday 25 April 2009 ten students from Rangitoto College, a secondary school in North Shore City, Auckland, exhibited influenza symptoms on returning from a three-week language trip to Mexico. All 22 students and three accompanying teachers from the trip and those in close contact with them were placed in voluntary home isolation and treated with oseltamivir. The ten students tested positive for an influenza A virus, with three of them later testing positive for swine flu. The symptoms were reportedly mild and all affected individuals have since recovered.

New Zealand has had a well-developed Influenza Pandemic action plan since 2006. Following this plan New Zealand immediately upgraded its influenza pandemic alert status to code yellow. The national stockpile of 1.4 million doses of oseltamivir was released to regional health authorities. The initial response as specified in the Pandemic Action Plan is a policy of border control and cluster control via voluntary quarantine and treatment of contacts with oseltamivir. As of May 24, this policy appears to have been successful in preventing the Mexican Flu from spreading within New Zealand.

New Zealand had about 48,000 influenza cases in the 2008 flu season – 42% of which were type A – and approximately 100 deaths a year directly attributed to influenza viruses.

As of July 21, there were 2,255 confirmed cases and 10 deaths. The Ministry Of Health changed plan from 'Containment' to 'Care in the Community'.

Palau
Palau has issued a health alert for swine flu.

Health Minister Dr. Stevenson Kuartei told reporters that although there is no reported case in Palau, a Task Force has been convened to increase screening of passengers entering the country.

On July 5, Palau confirmed its first case.

Papua New Guinea

On June 15, a young Port Moresby adult has contracted the disease.

Dr Mathias Sapuri said they are doing all they can to try to limit the spread of the virus.

The process of the step up of clinical surveillance in the country has been picked up by most health facilities throughout the country now. We are taking swab tests and are making clinical judgments on swine flu, to get on to the Tamiflu treatment.

Mathias Sapuri said health staff are also visiting the provinces to bring medication and test kits to them, and to help with their preparedness.

As of July 2, 2009, only one case is confirmed in the country.

Samoa
On June 15, Health Authorities confirmed the first case of flu. An Australian young student tested positive.

Solomon Islands
A multi-sectoral task force has been activated by the Solomon Islands Ministry of Health to deal with the swine influenza virus.

Permanent Secretary of the Ministry of Health and Medical Service Lester Ross said a task force is managing the Solomon Island Ministry of health's response to recent threat of swine flu epidemic.

On June 15, Health Authorities confirmed the first case of flu.

Tokelau
Most supplies and food shipments to Tokelau are sent by ferry from the neighboring country of Samoa. The Samoa Health Ministry had cancelled all travel to Tokelau until further notice as a precaution against the introduction of swine flu to the Tokelauan population. The Operations Manager for the Tokelau Office in Apia, Samoa,  Makalio Ioane, confirmed that some ferry travel would still be allowed to Tokelau, but the ship's crew would not be allowed to leave the boat or dock in Tokelau. The boat will be off loaded without any physical contact with the Tokelauan population. No cases of swine flu have been reported on either Tokelau or Samoa, so the cessation of travel to Tokelau is considered a precaution.

Tonga
Tonga has set up an Emergency Taskforce and is performing screen checks at its International Airport for passengers experiencing influenza symptoms, most importantly from flights originating from Los Angeles. In early July Tonga confirmed its first case of Swine flu and on July 21 its first death.

Nauru
One suspected case of swine flu has been identified in Nauru. Travelers entering Nauru are now screened for influenza symptoms, most importantly from flights originating from North America.

Vanuatu
Travelers entering the country via Santo-Pekoa International Airport and Bauerfield International Airport are now being screened using body heat detection before being allowed to exit the airport's gates. 1st case confirm in Vanuatu.

Timeline

References

Oceania
Health in Oceania
Flu